The Shamrock Handicap is a 1926 American romance film directed by John Ford. Prints of the film still exists in the Museum of Modern Art film archive and Cinematheque Royale de Belgique.

Cast
 Janet Gaynor as Lady Sheila O'Hara
 Leslie Fenton as Neil Ross
 Willard Louis as Orville Finch
 J. Farrell MacDonald as Cornelius Emmet Sarsfield "Con" O'Shea
 Claire McDowell as Molly O'Shea
 Louis Payne as Sir Miles O'Hara
 George Harris as Jockey Bennie Ginsburg (as Georgie Harris)
 Andy Clark as "Chesty" Morgan
 Ely Reynolds as Virus Cakes
 Thomas Delmar as Michaels (uncredited)
 Bill Elliott as Well-Wishing Villager (uncredited)
 Brandon Hurst as The Procurer of Taxes (uncredited)
 Eric Mayne as Doctor (uncredited)

References

External links

1926 films
1920s romance films
American silent feature films
American black-and-white films
Films directed by John Ford
Fox Film films
American romance films
1920s American films